Fend may refer to:

 Fend Flitzer, 3-wheeled invalid carriage
 Fritz Fend (1920–2000), German aeronautical engineer
 Kevin Fend (born 1990), Austrian soccer player
 Peter Fend (born 1950), U.S. artist and environmentalist
 FEND (Frame End), a code in the KISS (TNC) protocol

See also

 Stiff-arm fend, a rugby defensive maneuver
 
 Fender (disambiguation)